North American blizzard of 2010 may refer to any of six blizzards that took place in 2010:
January 2010 North American winter storms on January 16–28, 2010.
February 5–6, 2010 North American blizzard on February 5–6, 2010.
February 9–10, 2010 North American blizzard on February 9–10, 2010.
February 25–27, 2010 North American blizzard on February 25–27, 2010.
March 2010 nor'easter on March 12–16, 2010.
December 2010 North American blizzard on December 13–29, 2010.

2010